Stone Hedge is a historic estate at 222 Stone Hedge Lane in Polk County, North Carolina, north of Tryon.  The main house is a two-story structure, built primarily out of uncoursed rusticated stone.  The property, originally  includes a single-story guesthouse with similar construction.  The estate was built in 1935 by Thomas and Lillian Costa, and represents a distinctive architectural interpretation of North Carolina's mountain summer estates.

The house was added to the National Register of Historic Places in 2015.

References

Houses on the National Register of Historic Places in North Carolina
Houses completed in 1953
Houses in Polk County, North Carolina
National Register of Historic Places in Polk County, North Carolina